Jason Gerken is an American musician, who has played in Molly McGuire, Shiner, Open Hand, Project 86, and most recently, HUM as well as The Birth Defects and Sie Lieben Maschinen. Gerken took over for Bryan St. Pere of HUM, when he decided to part ways with the band. According to Bruce Fitzhugh, Gerken met the band, Project 86, on a tour of theirs along with Living Sacrifice and Stavesacre.

Selected discography
Molly McGuire
 Lime (1996) – Hit It! Recordings/Epic
 Sisters Of (1997) – Hit It! Recordings
 III (2014)

Season to Risk
 In a Perfect World (1995)
 1992–1997 (1998)

Gunfighter
 Pro-Electric (2002)
 High Noon (2002)

Shiner
 Starless (2000)
 The Egg (2001)

In for the Kill...
 Kingdom Sessions: Volume One" (2008)

Project 86
 Rival Factions (2007)
 The Kane Mutiny EP (2007)
 This Time of Year EP (2008)
 Picket Fence Cartel (2009)

Kingdom of Snakes
 Kingdom of Snakes (2004)

The Birth Defects
 First 8 Mistakes (2015)

Good Walkers
 Ralkin' Out!'' (2013)

References

American heavy metal drummers
Place of birth missing (living people)
Year of birth missing (living people)
American record producers
Living people
Open Hand members
Project 86 members